In Christianity, Christology (from the Greek  and ), translated from Greek as 'the study of Christ', is a branch of theology that concerns Jesus. Different denominations have different opinions on questions such as whether Jesus was human, divine, or both, and as a messiah what his role would be in the freeing of the Jewish people from foreign rulers or in the prophesied Kingdom of God, and in the salvation from what would otherwise be the consequences of sin.

These terms centered around two opposing themes, namely "Jesus as a preexistent figure who becomes human and then returns to God", versus adoptionism – that Jesus was human who was "adopted" by God at his baptism, crucifixion, or resurrection.

From the second to the fifth centuries, the relation of the human and divine nature of Christ was a major focus of debates in the early church and at the first seven ecumenical councils. The Council of Chalcedon in 451 issued a formulation of the hypostatic union of the two natures of Christ, one human and one divine, "united with neither confusion nor division". Most of the major branches of Western Christianity and Eastern Orthodoxy subscribe to this formulation, while many branches of Oriental Orthodox Churches reject it, subscribing to miaphysitism.

Definition and approaches

Christology (from the Greek  and ), literally 'the understanding of Christ', is the study of the nature (person) and work (role in salvation) of Jesus Christ. It studies Jesus Christ's humanity and divinity, and the relation between these two aspects; and the role he plays in salvation.

"Ontological Christology" analyzes the nature or being of Jesus Christ. "Functional Christology" analyzes the works of Jesus Christ, while "soteriological Christology" analyzes the "salvific" standpoints of Christology.

Several approaches can be distinguished within Christology. The term Christology from above or high Christology refers to approaches that include aspects of divinity, such as Lord and Son of God, and the idea of the pre-existence of Christ as the Logos ('the Word'), as expressed in the prologue to the Gospel of John. These approaches interpret the works of Christ in terms of his divinity. According to Pannenberg, Christology from above "was far more common in the ancient Church, beginning with Ignatius of Antioch and the second century Apologists." The term Christology from below or low Christology refers to approaches that begin with the human aspects and the ministry of Jesus (including the miracles, parables, etc.) and move towards his divinity and the mystery of incarnation.

Person of Christ

A basic Christological teaching is that the person of Jesus Christ is both human and divine. The human and divine natures of Jesus Christ apparently (prosopic) form a duality, as they coexist within one person (hypostasis). There are no direct discussions in the New Testament regarding the dual nature of the Person of Christ as both divine and human, and since the early days of Christianity, theologians have debated various approaches to the understanding of these natures, at times resulting in ecumenical councils, and schisms.

Some historical christological doctrines gained broad support:
 Monophysitism (Monophysite controversy, 3rd–8th centuries): After the union of the divine and the human in the historical incarnation, Jesus Christ had only a single nature. Monophysitism was condemned as heretical by the Council of Chalcedon (451).
 Miaphysitism (Oriental Orthodox churches): In the person of Jesus Christ, divine nature and human nature are united in a compound nature ('physis').
 Dyophysitism (Eastern Orthodox Church, Catholic Church, Lutheranism, Anglicanism, and the Reformed Churches): Christ maintained two natures, one divine and one human, after the Incarnation; articulated by the Chalcedonian Definition.
 Monarchianism (including Adoptionism and Modalism): God as one, in contrast to the doctrine of the Trinity. Condemned as heretical in the Patristic era but followed today by certain groups of Nontrinitarians.

Influential Christologies which were broadly condemned as heretical are:
 Docetism (3rd–4th centuries) claimed the human form of Jesus was mere semblance without any true reality.
 Arianism (4th century) viewed the divine nature of Jesus, the Son of God, as distinct and inferior to God the Father, e.g., by having a beginning in time.
 Nestorianism (5th century) considered the two natures (human and divine) of Jesus Christ almost entirely distinct.
 Monothelitism (7th century), considered Christ to have only one will.

Various church councils, mainly in the 4th and 5th centuries, resolved most of these controversies, making the doctrine of the Trinity orthodox in nearly all branches of Christianity. Among them, only the Dyophysite doctrine was recognized as true and not heretical, belonging to the Christian orthodoxy and deposit of faith.

Salvation

In Christian theology, atonement is the method by which human beings can be reconciled to God through Christ's sacrificial suffering and death. Atonement is the forgiving or pardoning of sin in general and original sin in particular through the suffering, death and resurrection of Jesus, enabling the reconciliation between God and his creation. Due to the influence of Gustaf Aulèn's (1879–1978)  (1931), the various theories or paradigmata of atonement are often grouped as "classical paradigm", "objective paradigm", and the "subjective paradigm":
 Classical paradigm:
 Ransom theory of atonement, which teaches that the death of Christ was a ransom sacrifice, usually said to have been paid to Satan or to death itself, in some views paid to God the Father, in satisfaction for the bondage and debt on the souls of humanity as a result of inherited sin. Gustaf Aulén reinterpreted the ransom theory, calling it the  doctrine, arguing that Christ's death was not a payment to the Devil, but defeated the powers of evil, which had held humankind in their dominion.;
 Recapitulation theory, which says that Christ succeeded where Adam failed. Theosis ('divinization') is a "corollary" of the recapitulation.
 Objective paradigm:
 Satisfaction theory of atonement, developed by Anselm of Canterbury (1033/4–1109), which teaches that Jesus Christ suffered crucifixion as a substitute for human sin, satisfying God's just wrath against humankind's transgression due to Christ's infinite merit.
 Penal substitution, also called "forensic theory" and "vicarious punishment", which was a development by the Reformers of Anselm's satisfaction theory. Instead of considering sin as an affront to God's honour, it sees sin as the breaking of God's moral law. Penal substitution sees sinful man as being subject to God's wrath, with the essence of Jesus' saving work being his substitution in the sinner's place, bearing the curse in the place of man.
 Governmental theory of atonement, "which views God as both the loving creator and moral Governor of the universe." 
 Subjective paradigm:
Moral influence theory of atonement, developed, or most notably propagated, by Abelard (1079–1142), who argued that "Jesus died as the demonstration of God's love", a demonstration which can change the hearts and minds of the sinners, turning back to God.
 Moral example theory, developed by Faustus Socinus (1539–1604) in his work  (1578), who rejected the idea of "vicarious satisfaction". According to Socinus, Jesus' death offers humanity a perfect example of self-sacrificial dedication to God.

Other theories are the "embracement theory" and the "shared atonement" theory.

Early Christologies (1st century)

Early notions of Christ
The earliest christological reflections were shaped by both the Jewish background of the earliest Christians, and by the Greek world of the eastern Mediterranean in which they operated. The earliest Christian writings give several titles to Jesus, such as Son of Man, Son of God, Messiah, and Kyrios, which were all derived from Hebrew scripture. According to Matt Stefon and Hans J. Hillerbrand:

Historically in the Alexandrian school of thought (fashioned on the Gospel of John), Jesus Christ is the eternal Logos who already possesses unity with the Father before the act of Incarnation. In contrast, the Antiochian school viewed Christ as a single, unified human person apart from his relationship to the divine.

Pre-existence
The notion of pre-existence is deeply rooted in Jewish thought, and can be found in apocalyptic thought and among the rabbis of Paul's time, but Paul was most influenced by Jewish-Hellenistic wisdom literature, where Wisdom' is extolled as something existing before the world and already working in creation. According to Witherington, Paul "subscribed to the christological notion that Christ existed prior to taking on human flesh[,] founding the story of Christ[...] on the story of divine Wisdom".

Kyrios
The title Kyrios for Jesus is central to the development of New Testament Christology. In the Septuagint it translates the Tetragrammaton, the holy Name of God. As such, it closely links Jesus with God – in the same way a verse such as Matthew 28:19, "The Name (singular) of the Father, the Son, and the Holy Spirit".

Kyrios is also conjectured to be the Greek translation of Aramaic , which in everyday Aramaic usage was a very respectful form of polite address, which means more than just 'teacher' and was somewhat similar to 'rabbi'. While the term  expressed the relationship between Jesus and his disciples during his life, the Greek Kyrios came to represent his lordship over the world.

The early Christians placed Kyrios at the center of their understanding, and from that center attempted to understand the other issues related to the Christian mysteries. The question of the deity of Christ in the New Testament is inherently related to the Kyrios title of Jesus used in the early Christian writings and its implications for the absolute lordship of Jesus. In early Christian belief, the concept of Kyrios included the pre-existence of Christ, for they believed if Christ is one with God, he must have been united with God from the very beginning.

Development of "low Christology" and "high Christology"

Two fundamentally different Christologies developed in the early Church, namely a "low" or adoptionist Christology, and a "high" or "incarnation" Christology. The chronology of the development of these early Christologies is a matter of debate within contemporary scholarship.

The "low Christology" or "adoptionist Christology" is the belief "that God exalted Jesus to be his Son by raising him from the dead", thereby raising him to "divine status". According to the "evolutionary model" or evolutionary theories, the Christological understanding of Jesus developed over time, as witnessed in the Gospels, with the earliest Christians believing that Jesus was a human who was exalted, or else adopted as God's Son, when he was resurrected. Later beliefs shifted the exaltation to his baptism, birth, and subsequently to the idea of his pre-existence, as witnessed in the Gospel of John. This evolutionary model was very influential, and the "low Christology" has long been regarded as the oldest Christology.

The other early Christology is "high Christology", which is "the view that Jesus was a pre-existent divine being who became a human, did the Father's will on earth, and then was taken back up into heaven whence he had originally come", and from where he appeared on earth. According to Bousset, this "high Christology" developed at the time of Paul's writing, under the influence of Gentile Christians, who brought their pagan Hellenistic traditions to the early Christian communities, introducing divine honours to Jesus. According to Casey and Dunn, this "high Christology" developed after the time of Paul, at the end of the first century CE when the Gospel of John was written.

Since the 1970s, these late datings for the development of a "high Christology" have been contested, and a majority of scholars argue that this "high Christology" existed already before the writings of Paul. According to the "New ", or the Early High Christology Club, which includes Martin Hengel, Larry Hurtado, N. T. Wright, and Richard Bauckham, this "incarnation Christology" or "high Christology" did not evolve over a longer time, but was a "big bang" of ideas which were already present at the start of Christianity, and took further shape in the first few decades of the church, as witnessed in the writings of Paul. Some 'Early High Christology' proponents scholars argue that this "high Christology" may go back to Jesus himself.

There is a controversy regarding whether Jesus himself claimed to be divine. In Honest to God, then-Bishop of Woolwich, John A. T. Robinson, questioned the idea. John Hick, writing in 1993, mentioned changes in New Testament studies, citing "broad agreement" that scholars do not today support the view that Jesus claimed to be God, quoting as examples Michael Ramsey (1980), C. F. D. Moule (1977), James Dunn (1980), Brian Hebblethwaite (1985) and David Brown (1985). Larry Hurtado, who argues that the followers of Jesus within a very short period developed an exceedingly high level of devotional reverence to Jesus, at the same time rejects the view that Jesus made a claim to messiahship or divinity to his disciples during his life as "naive and ahistorical". According to Gerd Lüdemann, the broad consensus among modern New Testament scholars is that the proclamation of the divinity of Jesus was a development within the earliest Christian communities. N. T. Wright points out that arguments over the claims of Jesus regarding divinity have been passed over by more recent scholarship, which sees a more complex understanding of the idea of God in first century Judaism. However, Andrew Loke argues that if Jesus did not claim and show himself to be truly divine and rise from the dead, the earliest Christian leaders who were devout ancient monotheistic Jews would have regarded Jesus as merely a teacher or a prophet; they would not have come to the widespread agreement that he was truly divine, which they did.

New Testament writings
The study of the various Christologies of the Apostolic Age is based on early Christian documents.

Paul

The oldest Christian sources are the writings of Paul. The central Christology of Paul conveys the notion of Christ's pre-existence and the identification of Christ as Kyrios. Both notions already existed before him in the early Christian communities, and Paul deepened them and used them for preaching in the Hellenistic communities.

What exactly Paul believed about the nature of Jesus cannot be determined decisively. In Philippians 2, Paul states that Jesus was preexistent and came to Earth "by taking the form of a servant, being made in human likeness". This sounds like an incarnation Christology. In Romans 1:4, however, Paul states that Jesus "was declared with power to be the Son of God by his resurrection from the dead", which sounds like an adoptionistic Christology, where Jesus was a human being who was "adopted" after his death. Different views would be debated for centuries by Christians and finally settled on the idea that he was both fully human and fully divine by the middle of the 5th century in the Council of Ephesus. Paul's thoughts on Jesus' teachings, versus his nature and being, is more defined, in that Paul believed Jesus was sent as an atonement for the sins of everyone.

The Pauline epistles use Kyrios to identify Jesus almost 230 times, and express the theme that the true mark of a Christian is the confession of Jesus as the true Lord. Paul viewed the superiority of the Christian revelation over all other divine manifestations as a consequence of the fact that Christ is the Son of God.

The Pauline epistles also advanced the "cosmic Christology" later developed in the Gospel of John, elaborating the cosmic implications of Jesus' existence as the Son of God: "Therefore, if anyone is in Christ, he is a new creation. The old has passed away; behold, the new has come." Paul writes that Christ came to draw all back to God: "Through him God was pleased to reconcile to himself all things, whether on earth or in heaven" (Colossians 1:20); in the same epistle, he writes that "He is the image of the invisible God, the firstborn of all creation" (Colossians 1:15).

The Gospels

The synoptic Gospels date from after the writings of Paul. They provide episodes from the life of Jesus and some of his works, but the authors of the New Testament show little interest in an absolute chronology of Jesus or in synchronizing the episodes of his life, and as in John 21:25, the Gospels do not claim to be an exhaustive list of his works.

Christologies that can be gleaned from the three Synoptic Gospels generally emphasize the humanity of Jesus, his sayings, his parables, and his miracles. The Gospel of John provides a different perspective that focuses on his divinity. The first 14 verses of the Gospel of John are devoted to the divinity of Jesus as the Logos, usually translated as "Word", along with his pre-existence, and they emphasize the cosmic significance of Christ, e.g.: "All things were made through him, and without him was not any thing made that was made." In the context of these verses, the Word made flesh is identical with the Word who was in the beginning with God, being exegetically equated with Jesus.

Controversies and ecumenical councils (2nd–8th century)

Post-Apostolic controversies
Following the Apostolic Age, from the second century onwards, a number of controversies developed about how the human and divine are related within the person of Jesus. As of the second century, a number of different and opposing approaches developed among various groups. In contrast to prevailing monoprosopic views on the Person of Christ, alternative dyoprosopic notions were also promoted by some theologians, but such views were rejected by the ecumenical councils. For example, Arianism did not endorse divinity, Ebionism argued Jesus was an ordinary mortal, while Gnosticism held docetic views which argued Christ was a spiritual being who only appeared to have a physical body. The resulting tensions led to schisms within the church in the second and third centuries, and ecumenical councils were convened in the fourth and fifth centuries to deal with the issues.

Although some of the debates may seem to various modern students to be over a theological iota, they took place in controversial political circumstances, reflecting the relations of temporal powers and divine authority, and certainly resulted in schisms, among others that separated the Church of the East from the Church of the Roman Empire.

First Council of Nicaea (325) and First Council of Constantinople (381)
In 325, the First Council of Nicaea defined the persons of the Godhead and their relationship with one another, decisions which were ratified at the First Council of Constantinople in 381. The language used was that the one God exists in three persons (Father, Son, and Holy Spirit); in particular, it was affirmed that the Son was homoousios (of the same being) as the Father. The Nicene Creed declared the full divinity and full humanity of Jesus. After the First Council of Nicaea in 325 the Logos and the second Person of the Trinity were being used interchangeably.

First Council of Ephesus (431)
In 431, the First Council of Ephesus was initially called to address the views of Nestorius on Mariology, but the problems soon extended to Christology, and schisms followed. The 431 council was called because in defense of his loyal priest Anastasius, Nestorius had denied the Theotokos title for Mary and later contradicted Proclus during a sermon in Constantinople. Pope Celestine I (who was already upset with Nestorius due to other matters) wrote about this to Cyril of Alexandria, who orchestrated the council. During the council, Nestorius defended his position by arguing there must be two persons of Christ, one human, the other divine, and Mary had given birth only to a human, hence could not be called the Theotokos, i.e. "the one who gives birth to God". The debate about the single or dual nature of Christ ensued in Ephesus.

The First Council of Ephesus debated miaphysitism (two natures united as one after the hypostatic union) versus dyophysitism (coexisting natures after the hypostatic union) versus monophysitism (only one nature) versus Nestorianism (two hypostases). From the Christological viewpoint, the council adopted  ('but being made one') – Council of Ephesus, Epistle of Cyril to Nestorius, i.e. 'one nature of the Word of God incarnate'. In 451, the Council of Chalcedon affirmed dyophysitism. The Oriental Orthodox rejected this and subsequent councils and continued to consider themselves as miaphysite according to the faith put forth at the Councils of Nicaea and Ephesus. The council also confirmed the Theotokos title and excommunicated Nestorius.

Council of Chalcedon (451)

The 451 Council of Chalcedon was highly influential, and marked a key turning point in the christological debates. It is the last council which many Lutherans, Anglicans and other Protestants consider ecumenical.

The Council of Chalcedon fully promulgated the Western dyophysite understanding put forth by Pope Leo I of Rome of the hypostatic union, the proposition that Christ has one human nature (physis) and one divine nature (physis), each distinct and complete, and united with neither confusion nor division. Most of the major branches of Western Christianity (Roman Catholicism, Anglicanism, Lutheranism, and Reformed), Church of the East, Eastern Catholicism and Eastern Orthodoxy subscribe to the Chalcedonian Christological formulation, while many branches of Oriental Orthodox Churches (Syrian Orthodoxy, Coptic Orthodoxy, Ethiopian Orthodoxy, and Armenian Apostolicism) reject it.

Although the Chalcedonian Creed did not put an end to all christological debate, it did clarify the terms used and became a point of reference for many future Christologies. But it also broke apart the church of the Eastern Roman Empire in the fifth century, and unquestionably established the primacy of Rome in the East over those who accepted the Council of Chalcedon. This was reaffirmed in 519, when the Eastern Chalcedonians accepted the Formula of Hormisdas, anathematizing all of their own Eastern Chalcedonian hierarchy, who died out of communion with Rome from 482 to 519.

Fifth-seventh Ecumenical Council (553, 681, 787)
The Second Council of Constantinople in 553 interpreted the decrees of Chalcedon, and further explained the relationship of the two natures of Jesus. It also condemned the alleged teachings of Origen on the pre-existence of the soul, and other topics.

The Third Council of Constantinople in 681 declared that Christ has two wills of his two natures, human and divine, contrary to the teachings of the Monothelites, with the divine will having precedence, leading and guiding the human will.

The Second Council of Nicaea was called under the Empress Regent Irene of Athens in 787, known as the second of Nicaea. It supports the veneration of icons while forbidding their worship. It is often referred to as "The Triumph of Orthodoxy".

9th–11th century

Eastern Christianity

Western medieval Christology
The term "monastic Christology" has been used to describe spiritual approaches developed by Anselm of Canterbury, Peter Abelard and Bernard of Clairvaux. The Franciscan piety of the 12th and 13th centuries led to "popular Christology". Systematic approaches by theologians, such as Thomas Aquinas, are called "scholastic Christology".

In the 13th century, Thomas Aquinas provided the first systematic Christology that consistently resolved a number of the existing issues. In his Christology from above, Aquinas also championed the principle of perfection of Christ's human attributes.

The Middle Ages also witnessed the emergence of the "tender image of Jesus" as a friend and a living source of love and comfort, rather than just the Kyrios image.

Reformation
John Calvin maintained there was no human element in the Person of Christ which could be separated from the Person of The Word. Calvin also emphasized the importance of the "Work of Christ" in any attempt at understanding the Person of Christ and cautioned against ignoring the Works of Jesus during his ministry.

Modern developments

Liberal Protestant theology
The 19th century saw the rise of Liberal Protestant theology, which questioned the dogmatic foundations of Christianity, and approached the Bible with critical-historical tools. The divinity of Jesus was problematized, and replaced with an emphasis on the ethical aspects of his teachings.

Roman Catholicism
Catholic theologian Karl Rahner sees the purpose of modern Christology as to formulate the Christian belief that "God became man and that God-made-man is the individual Jesus Christ" in a manner that this statement can be understood consistently, without the confusions of past debates and mythologies. Rahner pointed out the coincidence between the Person of Christ and the Word of God, referring to Mark 8:38 and Luke 9:26 which state whoever is ashamed of the words of Jesus is ashamed of the Lord himself.

Hans von Balthasar argued the union of the human and divine natures of Christ was achieved not by the "absorption" of human attributes, but by their "assumption". Thus, in his view, the divine nature of Christ was not affected by the human attributes and remained forever divine.

Topics

Nativity and the Holy Name

The Nativity of Jesus impacted the Christological issues about his person from the earliest days of Christianity. Luke's Christology centers on the dialectics of the dual natures of the earthly and heavenly manifestations of existence of the Christ, while Matthew's Christology focuses on the mission of Jesus and his role as the savior. The salvific emphasis of Matthew 1:21 later impacted the theological issues and the devotions to Holy Name of Jesus.

Matthew 1:23 provides a key to the "Emmanuel Christology" of Matthew. Beginning with 1:23, the Gospel of Matthew shows a clear interest in identifying Jesus as "God with us" and in later developing the Emmanuel characterization of Jesus at key points throughout the rest of the Gospel. The name 'Emmanuel' does not appear elsewhere in the New Testament, but Matthew builds on it in Matthew 28:20 ("I am with you always, even unto the end of the world") to indicate Jesus will be with the faithful to the end of the age. According to Ulrich Luz, the Emmanuel motif brackets the entire Gospel of Matthew between 1:23 and 28:20, appearing explicitly and implicitly in several other passages.

Crucifixion and resurrection

The accounts of the crucifixion and subsequent resurrection of Jesus provides a rich background for christological analysis, from the canonical Gospels to the Pauline Epistles.

A central element in the christology presented in the Acts of the Apostles is the affirmation of the belief that the death of Jesus by crucifixion happened "with the foreknowledge of God, according to a definite plan". In this view, as in Acts 2:23, the cross is not viewed as a scandal, for the crucifixion of Jesus "at the hands of the lawless" is viewed as the fulfilment of the plan of God.

Paul's Christology has a specific focus on the death and resurrection of Jesus. For Paul, the crucifixion of Jesus is directly related to his resurrection and the term "the cross of Christ" used in Galatians 6:12 may be viewed as his abbreviation of the message of the Gospels. For Paul, the crucifixion of Jesus was not an isolated event in history, but a cosmic event with significant eschatological consequences, as in 1 Corinthians 2:8. In the Pauline view, Jesus, obedient to the point of death (Philippians 2:8), died "at the right time" (Romans 5:6) based on the plan of God. For Paul, the "power of the cross" is not separable from the resurrection of Jesus.

Threefold office

The threefold office (Latin ) of Jesus Christ is a Christian doctrine based upon the teachings of the Old Testament. It was described by Eusebius and more fully developed by John Calvin. It states that Jesus Christ performed three functions (or "offices") in his earthly ministry – those of prophet, priest, and king. In the Old Testament, the appointment of someone to any of these three positions could be indicated by anointing him or her by pouring oil over the head. Thus, the term messiah, meaning "anointed one", is associated with the concept of the threefold office. While the office of king is that most frequently associated with the Messiah, the role of Jesus as priest is also prominent in the New Testament, being most fully explained in chapters 7 to 10 of the Book of Hebrews.

Mariology

Some Christians, notably Roman Catholics, view Mariology as a key component of Christology. In this view, not only is Mariology a logical and necessary consequence of Christology, but without it, Christology is incomplete, since the figure of Mary contributes to a fuller understanding of who Christ is and what he did.

Protestants have criticized Mariology because many of its assertions lack any Biblical foundation. Strong Protestant reaction against Roman Catholic Marian devotion and teaching has been a significant issue for ecumenical dialogue.

Joseph Cardinal Ratzinger (later Pope Benedict XVI) expressed this sentiment about Roman Catholic Mariology when in two separate occasions he stated, "The appearance of a truly Marian awareness serves as the touchstone indicating whether or not the christological substance is fully present" and "It is necessary to go back to Mary, if we want to return to the truth about Jesus Christ."

See also 

 Catholic spirituality
 Christian messianic prophecies
 Christian views of Jesus
 Christological argument
 Crucifixion of Jesus
 Doubting Thomas 
 Eucharist
 Eutychianism
 Five Holy Wounds
 Genealogy of Jesus 
 Great Church
 Great Tribulation
 Harrowing of Hell
 Kingship and Kingdom of God
 Last Judgement
 Life of Jesus in the New Testament
 Miracles of Jesus
 Names and titles of Jesus in the New Testament
 Religious perspectives on Jesus
 Paterology
 Pneumatology
 Rapture 
 Scholastic Lutheran Christology
 Second Coming of Christ 
 Transfiguration of Jesus
 Universal resurrection

Notes

References

Sources
Printed sources

 

 
 
 
 
  
 
 
 

Chilton, Bruce. "The Son of Man: Who Was He?” Bible Review. August 1996, 35+.
Cullmann, Oscar. The Christology of the New Testament. trans. Louisville: Westminster John Knox Press, 1980. 

 
 

 
 
 
 

 
Fuller, Reginald H. The Foundations of New Testament Christology. New York: Scribners, 1965. 

 Greene, Colin J.D. Christology in Cultural Perspective: Marking Out the Horizons. Grand Rapids: Eerdmans Publishing, 2004. 
 
 

 Hodgson, Peter C. Winds of the Spirit: A Constructive Christian Theology. Louisville: Westminster John Knox Press, 1994.

 
Kingsbury, Jack Dean. The Christology of Mark's Gospel. Philadelphia: Fortress Press, 1989.

Letham, Robert. The Work of Christ. Contours of Christian Theology. Downer Grove: IVP, 1993, 
 

 
 
MacLeod, Donald. The Person of Christ: Contours of Christian Theology. Downer Grove: IVP. 1998, 
 
 

 

 
 

 
 
 Wolfhart Pannenberg, Systematic Theology, T & T Clark, 1994 Vol.2.
 
 

 
 
 

 Schwarz, Hans. Christology. Grand Rapids: Eerdmans Publishing, 1998. 

 
 

 
 

Web-sources

Further reading
Overview
 
 
Early high Christology
 
 
 
 
 
 
 
 
 
Atonement

External links
Encyclopædia Britannica, Christology – full access article

 
Ancient Christian controversies
Catholic theology and doctrine
Christian terminology
Systematic theology